Just Loving You is a 1967 song by Anita Harris. Prior to Chasing Cars, it was the highest selling UK #6 and Ireland #18.  It charted very minorly in the U.S., reaching #120 and #20 Adult Contemporary.

It was given to Harris to sing by Tom Springfield after Harris appeared on Top of the Pops.

Recorded at Olympic Studios in a session produced by Margolis and featuring harmonica virtuoso Harry Pitch, "Just Loving You" hit the UK Top 50 on 1 July 1967. Even after peaking at No. 6 on 26 August 1967 "Just Loving You" remained in the UK Top 40 until the end of the year, dropping out of the chart on 27 January 1968.

References

1967 songs
1967 singles
Columbia Records singles
Songs written by Tom Springfield